"Good Girls" is a song by American R&B singer Joe. It was written by Joe, Joshua Thompson, and Michele Williams, and produced by Joe and Thompson for his second studio album All That I Am (1997). Released as the album's fourth single, it peaked at #1 on the U.S. R&B music charts and number 29 on the UK Singles Chart.

Track listings

Credits and personnel
 Timmy Allen – drum programming
 Earl Cohen – recording
 Onaje Allen Gumbs – fender rhodes
 Geary Moore – guitar
 Ron A. Schaffer – mixing
 Joe Thomas – producer, vocals, writer
 Joshua Thompson – producer, writer
 Michele Williams – writer

Charts

References

1997 singles
Joe (singer) songs
1997 songs
Jive Records singles
Song recordings produced by Joe (singer)
Songs written by Jolyon Skinner
Songs written by Joe (singer)
Songs written by Michele Williams